Moreton may refer to:

People

Given name 
 Moreton John Wheatley (1837–1916), British Army officer and Bailiff of the Royal Parks

Surname 
 Alice Bertha Moreton (1901–1977), English sculptor, draughtsman and artist
 Andrew Moreton, a pseudonym of Daniel Defoe
 Arabella Moreton (after 1690–1727), British poet
 Berkeley Moreton, 4th Earl of Ducie (1834–1924), British peer
 Marie Evelyn Moreton (1870–1949), Lady Byng
 Ivor Moreton (1908–1984), British singer and pianist
 Jimmy Moreton (1891–1942), English football player and manager
 John Moreton (1917–2012), British diplomat
 John Alfred Moreton, Royal Navy officer during the First World War
 Julian Moreton (1825–1900), Anglican missionary
 Kevin Moreton (born 1959), English actor
 Matthew Moreton, 1st Baron Ducie (1663–1735), British Army officer and politician
 Nicolas Moreton (born 1961), English artist
 Penelope Moreton (born 1932), Irish equestrian
 Ray Moreton (1942–2016), New Zealand rugby union player
 Robert Moreton (1922–1957), English comedian and actor born Henry Moreton
 Samuel Horatio Moreton (1843–1921), New Zealand artist, and explorer
 Stephen Moreton (born 1984), Irish cricketer
 Ursula Moreton (1903–1973), English ballerina and teacher
 Will Moreton (born 1997), American basketball player
 William Moreton (1641–1715), English prelate in the Church of Ireland
 William Moreton (–1763), English judge and politician

Places

Antarctica 
 Moreton Point, South Orkney Islands

Australia 
 Division of Moreton, an electoral district in the Australian House of Representatives, in Queensland
 Moreton Bay, a large bay near Brisbane, Queensland
 Moreton Island, a large island within the bay
 Cape Moreton, a rocky headland on the north eastern tip of Moreton Island
 Moreton Bay Region, a local government area in South East Queensland
 West Moreton, a statistical region of the state of Queensland, consisting of the entire rural western portion of South East Queensland

Greenland 
 Moreton station, a Norwegian hunting, meteorological and radio station in Southeastern Greenland

United Kingdom 
 Moreton, Dorset
 Moreton, Essex
 Moreton, Herefordshire, north of Leominster
 Moreton, Oxfordshire:
North Moreton
South Moreton
 Moreton, South Oxfordshire, near Thame
 Moreton, Merseyside
 Moreton, Staffordshire
 Moreton Corbet, Shropshire
 Moreton Jeffries, Herefordshire
 Moreton Morrell, Warwickshire
 Moreton Pinkney, Northamptonshire
 Moreton Road, a road in north Oxford, Oxfordshire
 Moreton Say, Shropshire
 Moreton Valence, Gloucestershire
 Moreton-in-Marsh, Gloucestershire
 Moreton on Lugg, Herefordshire
 Moretonhampstead, Devon

Other uses 
 , a Royal Australian Navy in Brisbane, Queensland

See also
 Morton (disambiguation)
 Moreton Hall (disambiguation)
 Moreton House (disambiguation)